Chipping is a rock climbing technique that uses a hammer and chisel to create artificial hand-holds on natural rock. The hammer and chisel may be substituted for any other tool that can take off layers of a rock to create a different feature on the rock. Within the climbing community this is an extremely controversial topic because it permanently modifies the natural features of a rock face. While in the past the practice was accepted or ignored, as more people have become climbers and environmental concerns have grown, there has been a trend against chipping. This process can also be referred to as "manufacturing" holds.

History 
The process of chipping has been around since the first ascents of famous routes such as "Outer Limits" in 1971  and "The Nose" of El Capitan in Yosemite in 1958  when chipping was acceptable.  Route manufacturing continued on through the clean climbing revolution of the 1970s where climbers moved away from outdated climbing technology, such as pitons, that damage rock to removable protection, such as nuts   that do not damage the rock. Pitons are pins that are hammered into the rock, whereas nuts are small pieces of metal that fit into cracks and are removable.  Manufacturing persisted on into the 1990s, especially in crags (an area that contains rock walls for climbing) in France. There are many instances of routes that are partially or even completely manufactured that were first put up in the mid 1990s in Europe. An example of this is L'autre Côté du Ciel by Fred Rouhling, or La Rose eh le Vampire by Antoine Le Menestrel (both in France). As indoor rock climbing gyms spread across the world in the mid 1990s, chipping seemed to subside as climbers could now create interesting routes with no need to modify rock.

Ethical controversy
Once the mid 1990s had passed, the manufacturing of routes also began to subside as many climbers decided that it was a mistake to change the natural features of routes. In many crags, especially around the United States, chipping is not only frowned upon by the community but also illegal. This fact though does not stop practice in many areas.

Proponents
Even though it is generally accepted that chipping is a bad practice, some climbing areas allow it. Some climbers in areas such as Riggins, Idaho have accepted the use of chipping for the creation of new routes. Those who support chipping in these select few climbing areas accept this practice because the area's rock face is blank and climbs would be physically impossible without manufactured holds. The general consensus in these areas seems to be that the common belief against chipping is less important than having areas to climb.

Opposition
According to climbing community polls, the large majority of climbers have a negative view on chipping. In fact, some are so vehemently opposed that they state they would take violent action against an individual who was chipping.  One of the main arguments against chipping is that as climbers try to push their limits and find harder routes to climb, chipped routes lower the difficulty and possibly ruin a route that could have been an interesting climb to a better climber. To some, like climbing guide book author Stewart Green, chipped routes reflect "egotism, selfishness, and mediocrity." According to Dave Graham there is a limited amount of climbable rock in the world and that by manufacturing a route it is impossible to ever put the rock back to its natural state.

Environmental issues
As more climbers join the sport every year, the environmental impact of climbing increases. Without clean climbing practices, techniques such as chipping have been shown to possibly compromise areas where rock climbing takes place. In an effort to partake in this endeavor, the National Park Service educates those looking to climb on its properties about the negative impact that practices like chipping have on natural resources. Climbers are usually informed about these issues during the process of picking up national park permits.

In the media
In February 2013, an anonymous video of world class climber Ivan Greene was released. This video showed him chipping a climb on a boulder in the famous Gunks climbing crag in New York. Due to the release of this video, Ivan Greene was dropped by his sponsor Edelrid  who publicly announced that they would be cutting all ties to him.

References 

Climbing